The 1988 Embassy World Indoor Bowls Championship  was held at Alexandra Palace, London, England, from 5 to 13 March 1988.
The event moved to the newly rebuilt Alexandra Palace from the Coatbridge indoor bowling club. Seeds were introduced for the first time.

Hugh Duff won the title beating Wynne Richards in the final five games to one (7-0, 7-1, 2-7, 7-6, 7-4, 7-4).

The 1988 Midland Bank World Indoor Pairs Championship was held at the Bournemouth International Centre from 5 to 13 December 1987+.(+ Held in Dec 1987 to avoid a clash with the 1988 World Outdoor Championships).
Ian Schuback & Jim Yates won the title defeating Andy Thomson & Gary Smith 5-1 in the final (6-3, 7-5, 5-7, 8-2, 7-5, 7-5).

The 1988 Inaugural Women's Championship was held at the Llanelli Indoor Bowling Club from April 29 to 1 May 1. Margaret Johnston won the title beating Edna Bessell in the final 7-3 5-7 7-6 7-2.

Winners

Draw and results

Men's singles

Men's Pairs

Women's singles

Group stages

Group A Results

Group B Results

Medal round

References

External links
Official website

World Indoor Bowls Championship
1988 in bowls